Joanna Gabrielle McGilchrist (born 27 August 1983) is an English rugby union player. She represented  at the 2010 Women's Rugby World Cup. She was also named in the squad to the 2014 Women's Rugby World Cup.

McGilchrist is a physiotherapist.

References

External links
Player Profile

1983 births
Living people
England women's international rugby union players
English female rugby union players
Female rugby union players